The ornate dwarf gecko (Lygodactylus ornatus) is a species of gecko endemic to Madagascar.

References

Lygodactylus
Reptiles described in 1965
Reptiles of Madagascar
Endemic fauna of Madagascar